Martlet is a lightweight air-to-surface, surface-to-air, and surface-to-surface missile developed by Thales Air Defence for the United Kingdom. It is named after a mythical bird from English heraldry that never roosts, the martlet.

Developed as the Lightweight Multirole Missile (LMM) to meet the UK's "Future Air-to-Surface Guided Weapon (Light)" requirement, the Ministry of Defence (MOD) placed an initial order for 1,000 missiles with deliveries due to start in 2013. However, initial operating capability was considerably delayed and took place in 2021 with full operating capability anticipated in 2024. The missile was given the name "Martlet" in British service.

Development

The Lightweight Multirole Missile was initially conceived as Thales' response to the MoD's Future Air-to-Surface Guided Weapon (Light) FASGW(L) requirement. It was designed to be launched from a variety of naval, air and land platforms against a wide range of targets. High precision reduces collateral damage and makes the missile suitable for asymmetric littoral operations. Development began in 2008 and the LMM uses technology from an earlier Thales (formerly Shorts Missile Systems) missile, the Starstreak. Qualification testing and initial production commenced in late 2011, following an initial contract by the UK Ministry of Defence in April 2011. Thales has conducted successful guidance control firings, including a semi-active laser (SAL) version.

The MoD contract was for the design, development, and commissioning of a laser beam rider version of LMM, together with production of an initial quantity of 1,000 missiles. These are operated from the new AgustaWestland AW159 helicopters and the current armoured and light role Starstreak ground-based air-defence batteries of 12 Regiment Royal Artillery and 106th (Yeomanry) Regiment Royal Artillery. Thales graphics show helicopters carrying twin seven-round launchers. These were to enter service in 2015 but were considerably delayed. The contract was eventually funded by a deal to "re-role previously contracted budgets to facilitate the full-scale development, series production and introduction of the LMM."

Thales test-fired an LMM from a Schiebel Camcopter S-100, demonstrating a potential for use from unmanned aerial vehicles (UAVs).

Description
LMM is intended to provide a single family of weapons that can be used in different modes, including:
 Maritime – LMM will be carried on the new AgustaWestland AW159 Wildcat helicopters of the Royal Navy for use against small surface vessels. ASELSAN of Turkey has developed dedicated mounting systems which can also enable the LMM to be launched from naval platforms such as fast attack craft.
 Surface-to-surface – The dual-effect (blast fragmentation and shaped charge) of the LMM's warhead makes it suitable for use against a wide range of ground targets including light/medium armour.
 Air-launched – The missile's modular design allows for future development and introduction of alternative warheads and seekers.
 Surface-to-air – In July 2019, the Air Defence Troop of 30 Commando Information Exploitation Group tested LMMs in a surface-to-air mode against Meggitt Banshee target drones.

FFLMM/Fury

In July 2014, Thales unveiled a modification of the LMM that turns it into a glide bomb, called the FreeFall LMM (FFLMM). Thales partnered with Textron to market it as the Fury for the U.S. market, who provides a height-of-burst sensor and electronic safe-and-arm device.  The weapon had been in development for 18 months and undergone initial test drops in August 2013.  In comparison to the LMM, the FFLMM removes the rocket motor and associated components while keeping the body and control actuators, as well as adding inertial navigation system and GPS navigation, semi-active laser guidance in place of the beam-riding system, and four enlarged fins for increased lift.

The bomb is not intended to replace larger munitions, but be used as a smaller and cheaper alternative to self-propelled missiles, with three bombs able to fit on a single Hellfire missile rail. A potential role for the Fury could be to arm medium intelligence, surveillance and reconnaissance (ISR) UAVs like the RQ-7 Shadow to deal with fleeting or time-sensitive targets.

Surface-to-surface testing
In early 2019 HMS Sutherland tested a modified mounting for the 30 mm Automated Small Calibre Gun which incorporated a launcher for five Martlet LMMs, by firing four of them at a small speedboat target at the Aberporth range in Wales. The concept of mounting the missile alongside the  Bushmaster cannon was tested just 5 months after the idea's conception.

The intended role of the Martlet is to further extend the Type 23 frigate's capabilities against small, fast-moving targets beyond the current 30 mm, general purpose machine gun and Minigun options to provide a long-range "stand-off" ability. As of 2019 it was not clear whether the Royal Navy intends to equip any more Type 23s with the system.

Operational history
In May 2021, the Royal Navy deployed Martlet missiles for the first time as part of UK Carrier Strike Group 21. The missiles were carried by Wildcat HMA2 helicopters, four of which were deployed as part of the strike group. The missiles were fired operationally for the first time in October 2021.

The missile has been used by the Armed Forces of Ukraine to shoot down multiple Russian aircraft during the 2022 Russian invasion of Ukraine. They have been launched from MANPAD shoulder launchers and also from the Alvis Stormer armoured air defence vehicle. The systems were donated by the UK as part of a package of military aid.

The missile was used by a Royal Navy Wildcat helicopter to strike a retired US Navy frigate during a SINKEX in September 2022 — the first time the missile had been used to strike a realistic target at sea, as opposed to purpose-built targets.

Operators
  - 1,000 missiles on order, deployed operationally with helicopters since May 2021

  - Appeared being used in the surface-to-air role by Ukraine forces during the Russo-Ukrainian War

  - Ordered on June 2014. Unknown numbers.

  - Fielded as part of the Shikra air defence system.

See also
 Sea Venom (missile) - FASGW(H)
 CRV7-PG
 Hermes (missile)
 Precision guided derivatives of Hydra 70 rocket
 Roketsan Cirit
 List of missiles

References

External links
 Britain orders 1,000 Thales LMM missiles
 Lightweight Multirole Missile Janes (archived)

Guided missiles of the United Kingdom
United Kingdom defence procurement
Military equipment introduced in the 2020s